The 1885 Kentucky Derby was the 11th running of the Kentucky Derby. The race took place on May 14, 1885.

Full results

Payout

The winner received a purse of $4,630.
Second place received $200.

References

1885
Kentucky Derby
May 1885 sports events
Derby